Satyagopal Misra  was an Indian politician belonging to the Communist Party of India (Marxist). He was elected to the Lok Sabha ,the lower house of the Parliament of India from Tamluk in 1980, 1984,1989 and 1991.

References

External links
 Official biographical sketch in Parliament of India website

1939 births
2013 deaths
Communist Party of India (Marxist) politicians from West Bengal
People from Paschim Medinipur district
India MPs 1980–1984
India MPs 1984–1989
India MPs 1989–1991
India MPs 1991–1996
Lok Sabha members from West Bengal